Princess Gyeonghye (1436 – 17 January 1474), also known before as Princess Pyeongchang before her marriage, was a Joseon princess and the eldest child of Munjong of Joseon. She served as guardian for her only younger brother, Danjong of Joseon, when he ascended the throne underage.

Biography
The princess was born into the Jeonju Yi clan in 1436 to Yi Hyang, Crown Prince Hyang and Crown Princess Hyeondeok, who died later in 1441 after giving birth to her younger brother. Prior to her birth, the Princess had an older sister but she died prematurely in 1433. She was enfeoffed as Princess Pyeongchang. At some point during her childhood, Princess Pyeongchang was sent to live with a government minister, Jo Yu-rye (조유례), for safety. Munjong later noted that she regarded Jo as a foster father.

In January 1450, the princess was married to Jeong Jong of the Haeju Jeong clan and was granted the title Princess Gyeonghye. Jeong was raised to the position of Minister of Justice. The next year, Munjong of Joseon granted her land at Yangdeokbang (양덕방) to build a new mansion. Officials argued against this, as it required removing more than 30 families and Jeong already had a mansion, but the gift was bestowed anyway. She eventually birthed a daughter in a unknown year, but she died prematurely. In 1452, Princess Gyeonghye's brother ascended the throne and she acted as his guardian. Although along with the general Kim Jong-seo, she attempted to strengthen royal authority, a coup led by her uncle, Yi Yu, Grand Prince Suyang ended with her brother's banishment.

Reign of Sejo
In 1455, Jeong was banished to Gwangju, Gyeonggi Province and Princess Gyeonghye fell ill. Hearing of her illness, the new king Sejo of Joseon sent a servant to tend her, who Princess Gyeonghye used to send a message begging for Jeong to be restored, which was allowed. She was pregnant with her second child at the time and Sejo threatened that if she had a boy, the child would be killed. Queen Jeonghui, however, issued instructions that the child be spared regardless of its sex, telling the eunuch in charge that she would take responsibility for deceiving Sejo. After Princess Gyeonghye gave birth to her son in 1456 in exile in Gwangju, Jeolla Province, the eunuch dressed the child in female clothes and took him to the court where he was raised.

In 1461, Jeong was found guilty of rebelling against, with Buddhist monks, Sejo of Joseon and was executed by dismemberment. Princess Gyeonghye was judged guilty by association, her rank was reduced to nobi serf, and she was sent to the official royal convent, Jeongeobwon. Queen Jeonghui later intervened on the princess' behalf, persuading Sejo to restore her status, property, and servants.

Legacy and Death
On 27 December 1473, Princess Gyeonghye wrote a will, expressing her sorrow in not having her son married, describing her declining health, leaving her house in Jeongseon-bang, Hanyang and property in Tongjin (now Gimpo), Gyeonggi Province to him. Towards the end of her will, she urges her son to build a shrine to his grandfather, perform ancestral rites in accordance with Confucian tradition, and to pass it down the duty to his descendants. The will is in the Jangseogak, housed by the Academy of Korean Studies.

On 17 January 1474, the princess passed away during King Seongjong’s 5th year of reign. Her tomb was said to be built by Jeong In-ji with her tombstone written with the royal title of “Princess Pyeongchang”.

When Jeong Mi-su came of age, he married the second daughter, Lady Lee of the Jeonui Lee clan, of Lee Deok-ryang, and had a concubine. He had no children of his own so he adopted a 7th degree nephew from his clan. It is said that her son became close to his aunt-in-law and former Queen Jeongsun during her time in Jeongeobwon; acting as a maternal figure to him, and thus had her rites performed when she died in 1521 by his descendants as well.

Titles 

 1436 - January 1450: Her Royal Highness, Princess Pyeongchang of the Second Senior Rank (평창군주; 平昌郡主)
 January 1450 - 17 January 1474: Her Royal Highness, Princess Gyeonghye of Joseon (조선 경혜공주; 朝鲜 庆惠公主)

Family
 Great-Grandfather
 Taejong of Joseon (13 June 1367 - 30 May 1422) (태종, 太宗)
 Great-Grandmother
 Queen Wongyeong of the Yeoheung Min clan (29 July 1365 - 18 August 1420) (원경왕후 민씨)
 Grandfather
 Sejong of Joseon (7 May 1397 - 30 March 1450) (세종대왕)
 Grandmother
 Queen Sohyeon of the Cheongsong Sim clan (12 October 1395 - 19 April 1446) (소헌왕후 청송 심씨)
Father
 Munjong of Joseon (15 November 1414 – 1 June 1452)
Mother
 Queen Hyeondeok of the Andong Kwon clan (17 April 1418 – 10 August 1441)
 Grandfather: Kwon Jeon (권전, 權專), Internal Prince Hwasan (화산부원군, 花山府院君) (1372 - 1441)
 Grandmother: Choi Ah-ji (최아지, 崔阿只), Internal Princess Consort Haeryeong of the Haeju Choi clan (해령부부인 해주 최씨, 海寧府夫人 海州 崔氏) (? - 1456)
 Siblings
 Unnamed older sister (1433 - 1433)
 Younger brother: Danjong of Joseon (23 July 1441 - 24 December 1457)
 Sister-in-law: Queen Jeongsun of the Yeosan Song clan (1440 - 7 July 1521) (정순왕후 여산 송씨)
Spouse
  Jeong Jong of the Haeju Jeong clan (정종, 鄭悰) (? - 1461)
 Father-in-law: Jeong Chung-gyeong (정충경, 鄭忠敬) (? - 1443)
 Mother-in-law: Lady Min of the Yeoheung Min clan (정경부인 여흥 민씨, 貞敬夫人 驪興 閔氏)
 Sister-in-law: Lady Jeong (숙부인 정씨)
 Brother-in-law Gi Chok (기축) of the Haengju Gi clan (행주 기씨)
 Sister-in-law/aunt-in-law: Princess Consort Chunseong of the Haeju Jeong clan (춘성부부인 정씨); second wife of Grand Prince Yeongeung
 Uncle/Brother-in-law: Yi Yeom, Grand Prince Yeongeung (이염, 영응대군) (23 May 1434 - 7 March 1467)
 Children
 Daughter: Lady Jeong of the Haeju Jeong clan (해주 정씨); died prematurely 
 Son: Jeong Mi-su (정미수, 鄭眉壽) (1456 - 1512)
 Daughter-in-law: Lady Lee of the Jeonui Lee clan (정경부인 전의 이씨, 貞敬夫人 全義 李氏); second daughter of Lee Deok-ryang (이덕량, 李德良; 1435 - 1487)
 Adoptive grandson: Jeong Seung-hyu (정승휴, 鄭承休) (1488 - 1534)
 Adoptive great-granddaughter: Princess Consort Pajing of the Haeju Jeong clan (파징군부인 정씨, 波澄郡夫人 鄭氏) (1513 - 1560)
 Adoptive great-grandson-in-law: Yi Yeong, Prince Geumwon (이영 금원군) (1513 - 1562)
 Adoptive great-great-granddaughter: Lady Yi of the Jeonju Yi clan (전주 이씨)
 Adoptive great-great-grandson-in-law: Nam Gwan (남관, 南琯) of the Uiryeong Nam clan
 Unnamed adoptive great-great-great-grandson
 Adoptive great-great-great-granddaughter: Lady Nam of the Uiryeong Nam clan (의령 남씨)
 Adoptive great-great-grandson: Yi In, Prince Hareung (하릉군 이인) (9 May 1546 - 17 June 1592)
 Adoptive great-great-granddaughter-in-law: Princess Consort Pyeongsan of the Pyeongsan Shin clan (평산군부인 신씨, 平山郡夫人 申氏); daughter of Shin Yeo-jong (신여종, 申汝悰)
 Adoptive great-great-great-grandson: Yi Seok-ryeong, Prince Yeongje (영제군 이석령) (1568 - 1623)

Popular culture
 Portrayed by Hong Soo-hyun in the 2011 KBS2 TV series The Princess' Man.
 Portrayed by Kim Bo-mi in the 2016 KBS1 TV series Jang Yeong-sil.

References

Notes

Works cited

15th-century Korean people
1435 births
1473 deaths
Princesses of Joseon
Korean Buddhist nuns
15th-century Buddhist nuns